Ellipsometry is an optical technique for investigating the dielectric properties (complex refractive index or dielectric function) of thin films. Ellipsometry measures the change of polarization upon reflection or transmission and compares it to a model.

It can be used to characterize composition, roughness, thickness (depth), crystalline nature, doping concentration, electrical conductivity and other material properties. It is very sensitive to the change in the optical response of incident radiation that interacts with the material being investigated.

A spectroscopic ellipsometer can be found in most thin film analytical labs. Ellipsometry is also becoming more interesting to researchers in other disciplines such as biology and medicine. These areas pose new challenges to the technique, such as measurements on unstable liquid surfaces and microscopic imaging.

Etymology
The name "ellipsometry" stems from the fact that elliptical polarization of light is used. The term "spectroscopic" relates to the fact that the information gained is a function of the light's wavelength or energy (spectra). The technique has been known at least since 1888 by the work of Paul Drude and has many applications today.

The first documented use of the term "ellipsometry" was in 1945.

Basic principles
The measured signal is the change in polarization as the incident radiation (in a known state) interacts with the material structure of interest (reflected, absorbed, scattered, or transmitted). The polarization change is quantified by the amplitude ratio, Ψ, and the phase difference, Δ (defined below). Because the signal depends on the thickness as well as the material properties, ellipsometry can be a universal tool for contact free determination of thickness and optical constants of films of all kinds.

Upon the analysis of the change of polarization of light, ellipsometry can yield information about layers that are thinner than the wavelength of the probing light itself, even down to a single atomic layer. Ellipsometry can probe the complex refractive index or dielectric function tensor, which gives access to fundamental physical parameters like those listed above. It is commonly used to characterize film thickness for single layers or complex multilayer stacks ranging from a few angstroms or tenths of a nanometer to several micrometers with an excellent accuracy.

Experimental details
Typically, ellipsometry is done only in the reflection setup. The exact nature of the polarization change is determined by the sample's properties (thickness, complex refractive index or dielectric function tensor). Although optical techniques are inherently diffraction-limited, ellipsometry exploits phase information (polarization state), and can achieve sub-nanometer resolution. In its simplest form, the technique is applicable to thin films with thickness of less than a nanometer to several micrometers. Most models assume the sample is composed of a small number of discrete, well-defined layers that are optically homogeneous and isotropic. Violation of these assumptions requires more advanced variants of the technique (see below).

Methods of immersion or multiangular ellipsometry are applied to find the optical constants of the material with rough sample surface or presence of inhomogeneous media. New methodological approaches allow the use of reflection ellipsometry to measure physical and technical characteristics of gradient elements in case the surface layer of the optical detail is inhomogeneous.

Experimental setup

Electromagnetic radiation is emitted by a light source and linearly polarized by a polarizer. It can pass through an optional compensator (retarder, quarter wave plate) and falls onto the sample. After reflection the radiation passes a compensator (optional) and a second polarizer, which is called an analyzer, and falls into the detector. Instead of the compensators, some ellipsometers use a phase-modulator in the path of the incident light beam. Ellipsometry is a specular optical technique (the angle of incidence equals the angle of reflection). The incident and the reflected beam span the plane of incidence.  Light which is polarized parallel to this plane is named p-polarized. A polarization direction perpendicular is called s-polarized (s-polarised), accordingly. The "s" is contributed from the German "" (perpendicular).

Data acquisition
Ellipsometry measures the complex reflectance ratio  of a system, which may be parametrized by the amplitude component  and the phase difference . The polarization state of the light incident upon the sample may be decomposed into an s and a p component (the s component is oscillating perpendicular to the plane of incidence and parallel to the sample surface, and the p component is oscillating parallel to the plane of incidence).
 
(Note that the right side of the equation is simply another way to represent a complex number.) Since ellipsometry is measuring the ratio (or difference) of two values (rather than the absolute value of either), it is very robust, accurate, and reproducible. For instance, it is relatively insensitive to scatter and fluctuations and requires no standard sample or reference beam.

Data analysis
Ellipsometry is an indirect method, i.e. in general the measured  and  cannot be converted directly into the optical constants of the sample. Normally, a model analysis must be performed, for example the Forouhi Bloomer model. This is one weakness of ellipsometry. Models can be physically based on energy transitions or simply free parameters used to fit the data. 
 
In all other cases a layer model must be established, which considers the optical constants (refractive index or dielectric function tensor) and thickness parameters of all individual layers of the sample including the correct layer sequence. The calculated  and  values which match the experimental data best provide the optical constants and thickness parameters of the sample.

Definitions
Modern ellipsometers are complex instruments that incorporate a wide variety of radiation sources, detectors, digital electronics and software.  The range of wavelength employed is far in excess of what is visible so strictly these are no longer optical instruments.

Single-wavelength vs. spectroscopic ellipsometry
Single-wavelength ellipsometry employs a monochromatic light source. This is usually a laser in the visible spectral region, for instance, a HeNe laser with a wavelength of 632.8 nm. Therefore, single-wavelength ellipsometry is also called laser ellipsometry. The advantage of laser ellipsometry is that laser beams can be focused on a small spot size. Furthermore, lasers have a higher power than broad band light sources. Therefore, laser ellipsometry can be used for imaging (see below). Spectroscopic ellipsometry (SE) employs broad band light sources, which cover a certain spectral range in the infrared, visible or ultraviolet spectral region. By that the complex refractive index or the dielectric function tensor in the corresponding spectral region can be obtained, which gives access to a large number of fundamental physical properties. Infrared spectroscopic ellipsometry (IRSE) can probe lattice vibrational (phonon) and free charge carrier (plasmon) properties. Spectroscopic ellipsometry in the near infrared, visible up to ultraviolet spectral region studies the refractive index in the transparency or below-band-gap region and electronic properties, for instance, band-to-band transitions or excitons.

Standard vs. generalized ellipsometry (anisotropy)
Standard ellipsometry (or just short 'ellipsometry') is applied, when no s polarized light is converted into p polarized light nor vice versa. This is the case for optically isotropic samples, for instance, amorphous materials or crystalline materials with a cubic crystal structure. Standard ellipsometry is also sufficient for optically uniaxial samples in the special case, when the optical axis is aligned parallel to the surface normal. In all other cases, when s polarized light is converted into p polarized light and/or vice versa, the generalized ellipsometry approach must be applied.  Examples are arbitrarily aligned, optically uniaxial samples, or optically biaxial samples.

Jones matrix vs. Mueller matrix formalism (depolarization)
There are typically two different ways of mathematically describing how an electromagnetic wave interacts with the elements within an ellipsometer (including the sample): the Jones matrix and the Mueller matrix formalisms. In the Jones matrix formalism, the electromagnetic wave is described by a Jones vector with two orthogonal complex-valued entries for the electric field (typically  and ), and the effect that an optical element (or sample) has on it is described by the complex-valued 2×2 Jones matrix.  In the Mueller matrix formalism, the electromagnetic wave is described by Stokes vectors with four real-valued entries, and their transformation is described by the real-valued 4x4 Mueller matrix. When no depolarization occurs both formalisms are fully consistent. Therefore, for non-depolarizing samples, the simpler Jones matrix formalism is sufficient. If the sample is depolarizing the Mueller matrix formalism should be used, because it also gives the amount of depolarization. Reasons for depolarization are, for instance, thickness non-uniformity or backside-reflections from a transparent substrate.

Advanced experimental approaches

Imaging ellipsometry
Ellipsometry can also be done as imaging ellipsometry by using a CCD camera as a detector. This provides a real time contrast image of the sample, which provides information about film thickness and refractive index. Advanced imaging ellipsometer technology operates on the principle of classical null ellipsometry and real-time ellipsometric contrast imaging.  Imaging ellipsometry is based on the concept of nulling.  In ellipsometry, the film under investigation is placed onto a reflective substrate.  The film and the substrate have different refractive indexes.  In order to obtain data about film thickness, the light reflecting off of the substrate must be nulled.  Nulling is achieved by adjusting the analyzer and polarizer so that all reflected light off of the substrate is extinguished.  Due to the difference in refractive indexes, this will allow the sample to become very bright and clearly visible. The light source consists of a monochromatic laser of the desired wavelength. A common wavelength that is used is 532 nm green laser light.  Since only intensity of light measurements are needed, almost any type of camera can be implemented as the CCD, which is useful if building an ellipsometer from parts.   Typically, imaging ellipsometers are configured in such a way so that the laser (L) fires a beam of light which immediately passes through a linear polarizer (P).  The linearly polarized light then passes through a quarter wavelength compensator (C) which transforms the light into elliptically polarized light.   This elliptically polarized light then reflects off the sample (S), passes through the analyzer (A) and is imaged onto a CCD camera by a long working distance objective. The analyzer here is another polarizer identical to the P, however, this polarizer serves to help quantify the change in polarization and is thus given the name analyzer.  This design is commonly referred to as a LPCSA configuration.

The orientation of the angles of P and C are chosen in such a way that the elliptically polarized light is completely linearly polarized after it is reflected off the sample. For simplification of future calculations, the compensator can be fixed at a 45 degree angle relative to the plane of incidence of the laser beam.  This set up requires the rotation of the analyzer and polarizer in order to achieve null conditions.    The ellipsometric null condition is obtained when A is perpendicular with respect to the polarization axis of the reflected light achieving complete destructive interference, i.e., the state at which the absolute minimum of light flux is detected at the CCD camera. The angles of P, C, and A obtained are used to determine the Ψ and Δ values of the material.
  and 
where A and P are the angles of the analyzer and polarizer under null conditions respectively.  By rotating the analyzer and polarizer and measuring the change in intensities of light over the image, analysis of the measured data by use of computerized optical modeling can lead to a deduction of spatially resolved film thickness and complex refractive index values.

Due to the fact that the imaging is done at an angle, only a small line of the entire field of view is actually in focus.  The line in focus can be moved along the field of view by adjusting the focus.  In order to analyze the entire region of interest, the focus must be incrementally moved along the region of interest with a photo taken at each position.  All of the images are then compiled into a single, in focus image of the sample.

In situ ellipsometry
In situ ellipsometry refers to dynamic measurements during the modification process of a sample. This process can be used to study, for instance, the growth of a thin film, including calcium phosphate mineralization at the air-liquid interface, etching or cleaning of a sample. By in situ ellipsometry measurements it is possible to determine fundamental process parameters, such as, growth or etch rates,  variation of optical properties with time. In situ ellipsometry measurements require a number of additional considerations: The sample spot is usually not as easily accessible as for ex situ measurements outside the process chamber. Therefore, the mechanical setup has to be adjusted, which can include additional optical elements (mirrors, prisms, or lenses) for redirecting or focusing the light beam. Because the environmental conditions during the process can be harsh, the sensitive optical elements of the ellipsometry setup must be separated from the hot zone. In the simplest case this is done by optical view ports, though strain induced birefringence of the (glass-) windows has to be taken into account or minimized. Furthermore, the samples can be at elevated temperatures, which implies different optical properties compared to samples at room temperature. Despite all these problems, in situ ellipsometry becomes more and more important as process control technique for  thin film deposition and modification tools. In situ ellipsometers can be of single-wavelength or spectroscopic type. Spectroscopic in situ ellipsometers use multichannel detectors, for instance CCD detectors, which measure the ellipsometric parameters for all wavelengths in the studied spectral range simultaneously.

Ellipsometric porosimetry
Ellipsometric porosimetry measures the change of the optical properties and thickness of the materials during adsorption and desorption of a volatile species at atmospheric pressure or under reduced pressure depending on the application. The EP technique is unique in its ability to measure porosity of very thin films down to 10 nm, its reproducibility and speed of measurement. Compared to traditional porosimeters, Ellipsometer porosimeters are well suited to very thin film pore size and pore size distribution measurement. Film porosity is a key factor in silicon based technology using low-κ materials, organic industry (encapsulated organic light-emitting diodes) as well as in the coating industry using sol gel techniques.

Magneto-optic generalized ellipsometry
Magneto-optic generalized ellipsometry (MOGE) is an advanced infrared spectroscopic ellipsometry technique for studying free charge carrier properties in conducting samples. By applying an external magnetic field it is possible to determine independently the density, the optical mobility parameter and the effective mass parameter of free charge carriers. Without the magnetic field only two out of the three free charge carrier parameters can be extracted independently.

Applications
This technique has found applications in many different fields, from semiconductor physics to microelectronics and biology, from basic research to industrial applications. Ellipsometry is a very sensitive measurement technique and provides unequaled capabilities for thin film  metrology. As an optical technique, spectroscopic ellipsometry is non-destructive and contactless. Because the incident radiation can be focused, small sample sizes can be imaged and desired characteristics can be mapped over a larger area (m2).

Advantages
Ellipsometry has a number of advantages compared to standard reflection intensity measurements:

 Ellipsometry measures at least two parameters at each wavelength of the spectrum. If generalized ellipsometry is applied up to 16 parameters can be measured at each wavelength.
 Ellipsometry measures an intensity ratio instead of pure intensities. Therefore, ellipsometry is less affected by intensity instabilities of the light source or atmospheric absorption.
 By using polarized light, normal ambient unpolarized stray light does not significantly influence the measurement, no dark box is necessary.
 No reference measurement is necessary.
Ellipsometry is especially superior to reflectivity measurements when studying anisotropic samples.

See also
 Photo-reflectance
 Petrographic microscope
 Polarimetry
 Spectroscopy

References

Further reading
 R. M. A. Azzam and N. M. Bashara, Ellipsometry and Polarized Light, Elsevier Science Pub Co (1987) 
 A. Roeseler, Infrared Spectroscopic Ellipsometry, Akademie-Verlag, Berlin (1990), 
 H. G. Tompkins, A Users's Guide to Ellipsometry, Academic Press Inc, London (1993), 
 H. G. Tompkins and W. A. McGahan, Spectroscopic Ellipsometry and Reflectometry, John Wiley & Sons Inc (1999) 
 I. Ohlidal and D. Franta, Ellipsometry of Thin Film Systems, in Progress in Optics, vol. 41, ed. E. Wolf, Elsevier, Amsterdam, 2000, pp. 181–282
 M. Schubert, Infrared Ellipsometry on semiconductor layer structures: Phonons, Plasmons, and Polaritons, Series: Springer Tracts in Modern Physics, Vol. 209, Springer (2004), 
 H. G. Tompkins and E. A. Irene (Editors), Handbook of Ellipsometry William Andrews Publications, Norwich, NY (2005), 
 H. Fujiwara,  Spectroscopic Ellipsometry: Principles and Applications, John Wiley & Sons Inc (2007), 
 M. Losurdo and K. Hingerl (Editors), Ellipsometry at the Nanoscale, Springer (2013), 
 K. Hinrichs and K.-J. Eichhorn (Editors), Ellipsometry of Functional Organic Surfaces and Films, Springer (2014), 

Optical metrology
Radiometry
Spectroscopy